Richard Whittington (12 February 1948 – 3 January 2011), was a British food writer.

Early life
Whittington was born on 12 February 1948, in Bury St Edmunds, Suffolk, England, to Jeffery and Florence Whittington, the youngest of four children. He attended Essex University for a year, studying American literature, but left to begin a career in journalism.

At the age of 25, he was diagnosed with multiple sclerosis, and in his last 20 years he required the use of a wheelchair.

Personal life
In 1969, he met and married Jane Eckersley. They had a son, and split up in 1972. His second wife, Pippa Steel, died in 1992.

Whittington died on 3 January 2011, aged 62.

Publications
  With Alastair Little.
 Food of the Sun. 1995. With Alastair Little
 Quaglino's 1996, Overlook Press. With Martin Webb
 The (Daily Mail) Modern British Cookbook. 1998. With Alastair Little

References

1948 births
2011 deaths
British food writers
Writers from Bury St Edmunds
People with multiple sclerosis